The 1980 Copa del Rey Final was the 78th final of the King's Cup, Spain's premier football competition. The final was played at Santiago Bernabéu Stadium in Madrid, on 4 June 1980, and was won by Real Madrid, who beat their own reserve team Castilla 6–1.

Match

Summary
According to Euan McTear of These Football Times "Castilla were a shadow of the vibrant side that had thrilled the Spanish capital and the country throughout the previous few months".

With goals from Juanito and Santillana, Castilla fell to a 2–0 deficit by half-time. After 45 minutes of play, Andrés Sabido and Vicente del Bosque added a third and a fourth either side of the hour mark to create an insurmountable gap between the two sides.

Castilla's Ricardo Álvarez managed to narrow the deficit with ten minutes remaining. According to McTear this gesture just provoked the senior side, who had been winding the clock down for the last minutes. Seconds after Castilla scored, substitute Francisco García Hernández made it 5–1 before a last minute Juanito penalty sealed off a 6–1 triumph. After the final whistle both teams celebrated with the trophy.

Details

References

1980
1979–80 in Spanish football
Real Madrid CF matches
Real Madrid Castilla